Loi Tung is a village in Sha Tau Kok, North District, Hong Kong.

Administration
Loi Tung is a recognized village under the New Territories Small House Policy. It is one of the villages represented within the Sha Tau Kok District Rural Committee. For electoral purposes, Loi Tung is part of the Sha Ta constituency, which is currently represented by Ko Wai-kei.

History
Loi Tung is part of the Four Yeuk, which comprises Loi Tung, Lung Yeuk Tau, Lin Ma Hang and Tan Chuk Hang. The centre of the Alliance is the Hung Shing Temple at Hung Leng.

At the time of the 1911 census, the population of Loi Tung was 191. The number of males was 107.

Loi Tung was served by the Loi Tung station of the former Sha Tau Kok Railway, which was in operation from 1911 to 1928. Loi Tung station was opened in February 1916.

Features
 Ting Yat Study Hall
 Wan Gau Study Hall

References

External links
 Delineation of area of existing village Loi Tung (Sha Tau Kok) for election of resident representative (2019 to 2022)
 Antiquities Advisory Board. Pictures of Ting Yat Study Hall
 Antiquities Advisory Board. Pictures of Wan Gau Study Hall

Villages in North District, Hong Kong
Sha Tau Kok